The 2018–19 Shakhtar Donetsk season was the club's 28th season.

Squad
The squad is as of 4 March 2019.

Other players under the contract

U21 team squad

New contracts

Transfers

Transfer in

Transfer out

Loan in

Loan out

Loan return

2018–19 selection by nationality

Friendlies

Competitions

Overall
{| class="wikitable" style="text-align:center; width:730px;"
|-
! style="text-align:center; width:150px;" | Competition
! style="text-align:center; width:100px;" | Started round
! style="text-align:center; width:100px;" | Current  position
! style="text-align:center; width:100px;" | Final  position
! style="text-align:center; width:150px;" | First match
! style="text-align:center; width:150px;" | Last match
|-
| style="text-align:left;" | Premier League
| Matchday 1
| —
| style="text-align:center; background:gold;"|Winners
| 25 July 2018
| 30 May 2019
|-
| style="text-align:left;" | Cup
| Round of 16
| —
| style="text-align:center; background:gold;"|Winners
| 31 October 2018
| 15 May 2019
|-
| style="text-align:left;" | Super Cup
| Final
| —
| Runner-up
| 21 July 2018
| 21 July 2018
|-
| style="text-align:left;" | Champions League
| Group stage
| —
| Group stage
| 19 September 2018
| 12 December 2018
|-
| style="text-align:left;" | Europa League
| Round of 32
| —
| Round of 32
| 14 February 2019
| 21 February 2019

Overview

Goalscorers

Clean sheets

Disciplinary record

Notes

References

External links 
Official website

Shakhtar Donetsk
FC Shakhtar Donetsk seasons
Ukrainian football championship-winning seasons
Shakhtar Donetsk